Berringer Lake is a locality in New South Wales, Australia in the City of Shoalhaven.

References

Towns in New South Wales
City of Shoalhaven
Towns in the South Coast (New South Wales)